Opostegoides pelorrhoa is a moth of the family Opostegidae. It was described by Edward Meyrick in 1915. It is known from Assam, India.

References

Opostegidae
Moths described in 1915